The Wood Canyon Formation is a geologic formation in the northern Mojave Desert of Inyo County, California and Nye County and Clark County, Nevada.

It can be seen in the Panamint Range and Funeral Mountains adjoining Death Valley, within Death Valley National Park; and in the Spring Mountains in Clark County.

Geology
The 570+ million years old formation underlies the Zabriskie Quartzite Formation, and overlies the Stirling Quartzite Formation.

It has members of quartzite, shale, sandstone, and dolomite.

Fossils
It preserves scattered olenellid trilobite and archaeocyathid fossils in upper part of formation, dating back to the Ediacaran period of the Neoproterozoic Era and Lower Cambrian Period of the Paleozoic Era.

See also

 List of fossiliferous stratigraphic units in California
 List of fossiliferous stratigraphic units in Nevada
 Paleontology in California
 Paleontology in Nevada

References

Quartzite formations
Cambrian California
Cambrian geology of Nevada
Ediacaran California
Ediacaran geology of Nevada
Geology of Inyo County, California
Natural history of the Mojave Desert
Death Valley National Park
Panamint Range
Geologic formations of California
Geologic formations of Nevada
Cambrian southern paleotropical deposits